Radames Pera (born September 14, 1960) is an American actor best known for his role as "Grasshopper," the student Kwai Chang Caine in the 1972–1975 television series Kung Fu.

Early life and acting career
Pera was born in New York City, the son of actress Lisa Pera. His mother moved to Hollywood in 1963 so that she could pursue an acting career.

At age eight, Radames was asked by director Daniel Mann to play the role of Anthony Quinn and Irene Papas' dying son in the film A Dream of Kings (1969). He met the director at a dinner party and was eventually cast in the role of Stavros.

From 1972 until 1975, Radames appeared as the young Kwai Chang Caine in the ABC television series Kung Fu. Caine was an orphan from Hunan Province in China who had an American father and a Chinese mother. He appeared throughout the 4-year run show on ABC and worldwide re-runs. For the role of Caine, Radames was shaved bald, except in the pilot movie, where he was shown with hair before the scenes showing his head being shaved.

In the series he mainly worked with veteran Asian-American actors Philip Ahn (Master Kan), Keye Luke (blind Master Po, who called him "Grasshopper") and Richard Loo (Master Sun), and was mostly shown living in a Shaolin Monastery where he was taught by the monks to be a Shaolin master. He is depicted as the first person to be welcomed into a Shaolin Monastery who was not of full Chinese birth.  Kwai Chang Caine as an adult was played by David Carradine.

Radames also had a recurring role on Little House on the Prairie as John (Jr.), eldest adopted son of Mr. Edwards, and became Mary Ingalls' love interest during the show's second and third seasons.

Pera's other acting roles include a disturbed pre-teen in an episode of Night Gallery, "Silent Snow, Secret Snow", narrated by Orson Welles; guest appearances on The Six Million Dollar Man; and as Don Ameche's son in the telefilm Gidget Gets Married.  Between 1969 and 1985 other guest-starring credits include Lassie, Marcus Welby, M.D., Family Affair, Hawaii Five-O and The Waltons among many others.

Radames withdrew from the acting business entirely after 1987. His final television appearances were on Mickey Spillane's The New Mike Hammer, and Starman. His last film role of the 20th century was as a Soviet soldier, Sgt. Stepan Gorsky in John Milius' Red Dawn (1984).

He has been living in France since 2017.

Post-acting career
Pera developed other interests in video and electronics and eventually, in 1988, formed his own company in Los Angeles called All Systems Go! that designed and installed home theaters and residential sound systems. After about five years in southern California, he and his family relocated to Portland, Oregon for approximately ten years, then to Austin, Texas.  For several years he specialized in eliminating remote control clutter and other AV and WiFi solutions at his San Diego-based company. After moving with his wife and daughter to France in 2017, Pera has written his memoirs and is currently seeking a publisher. He has also returned to his first craft of acting.

References

External links

 

1960 births
Living people
Los Angeles City College alumni
Male actors from Los Angeles
Male actors from New York City
20th-century American male actors